Charles Davidson has been the Bishop of Guyana since 2016.

Davidson was born in Mackenzie, Linden, educated at Mackenzie High School, Government Technical Institute in Electrical Craft Practice and at Codrington College, Barbados and University of the West Indies, Cave Hill.  He was ordained a deacon in 1977 and a priest in 1978.  He did post grad work at Princeton Theological Seminary, General Theological Seminary and University of the South, Sewanee. He is a trained mentor and consultant in Congregational Development specializing in church wellness. His previous post was as a parish priest in Philadelphia.

References

Living people
21st-century Anglican bishops in the Caribbean
Anglican bishops of Guyana
Alumni of Codrington College
Alumni of the United Theological College, Jamaica
Year of birth missing (living people)